10B or X-B may refer to:
 Oflag X-B, a World War II German POW camp for officers located near Nienburg am Weser
 Stalag X-B, a World War II German Prisoner-of-war camp located near Sandbostel
 A Mazda Wankel engine model
 Boron-10 (10B), an isotope of boron

See also
B10 (disambiguation)